Potassium erythorbate (C6H7KO6) is a food additive. Chemically, it is the potassium salt of erythorbic acid. As an antioxidant structurally related to vitamin C, it helps improve flavor stability and prevents the formation of carcinogenic nitrosamines.

References

Food antioxidants
Potassium compounds
Monosaccharides